Gorskaya, is a railway station in Saint Petersburg, Russia located between  Lisiy Nos in Primorsky District and the Sestroretsk in Kurortny District. The station was opened on November 26, 1894, as part of the Primorskaya Line opening section between Razdelnaya and Sestroretsk.

In 1952, the line was electrified, and at the same time, high platforms were constructed and it was reconstructed again from 1999 to 2001 when the Gorskaya road interchange was built.

Gallery

References

Railway stations in the Russian Empire opened in 1894
Railway stations in Saint Petersburg